Varzo railway station is a railway station in the comune of Varzo, in the Italian region of Piedmont. It is an intermediate stop on the standard gauge Simplon line of Rete Ferroviaria Italiana.

Services 
The following services stop at Varzo:

References

External links 
 
 

Railway stations in the Province of Verbano-Cusio-Ossola